Eddumailaram is a census town in Sangareddy District of Telangana.

Demographics 
As of the 2001 India census, Eddumailaram had a population of 13,584. Males constitute 52% of the population and females, 48%. The town has an average literacy rate of 77%, higher than the national average of 59.5%: male literacy is 82%, and female literacy is 71%. In Eddumailaram, 13% of the population is under 6 years of age.

References 

Census towns in Medak district